HMS Newt was a shore establishment of the Royal Navy during World War II, based at Newhaven, East Sussex.

Service history
It was commissioned on 15 October 1942 as a base for Combined Operations Landing Craft, and consisted of Hards at Seaford and Sleepers Hole (Newhaven Marina), with accommodation on nearby Fort Road. From March 1945 it was used by Naval Parties assigned to "Operation Eclipse" (the capture of ports in northern Germany). Newt was decommissioned on 22 June 1945.

References

Royal Navy shore establishments
Royal Navy bases in England
Military history of East Sussex